This is a list of radio comedies.

Produced independently

Man of the People: The Only-Recently Discovered Secret Political Recordings of Acting Mayor Francis "Woody" Woodson
The Sound of Young America
The Comedy-O-Rama Hour
The Wireless Theatre Company
The Auntie Mabel Hour, broadcast on the 1960s pirate radio station Radio City, off the British coast.

Australia

Produced by ABC (Australia)

The Idiot Weekly
Yes, What?/The Fourth Form at St Percy's (discontinued)
Coodabeen Champions

Canada 
Double Exposure
Frantic Times
The Royal Canadian Air Farce
Spring Thaw
Great Conversations with Joseph the Irish Potato Farmer

Produced by or for the CBC

CBC Festival of Comedy
CBC Festival of Funny
Canadia: 2056
Chas Lawther's Stand Up Documentaries
The Chumps Without a Net
The Dead Dog Cafe Comedy Hour
Double Exposure (comedy series)
The Frantics Frantic Times, Fran of the Fundy, and The Frantics Look at History 
Gary & Ivan's Winnebago Tour
Great Eastern
Growing Up and Having Babies
The Happy Gang
Here Come the Seventies (radio show)
How to Seem Smart
The Irrelevant Show
Laugh in a Half
Madly Off in All Directions
Mr. Interesting's Guide to the Continental United States
The Muckraker
The Norm
Radio Free Vestibule
Rick and Pete Grow Up and Have Babies
The Royal Canadian Air Farce
Running with Scissors with Mr. Interesting
Steve, The First
Steve, The Second
Sunny Days and Nights
This Hour Has 17 Programs
Those People Across the Street
The Vinyl Cafe
What a Week

Ireland

Produced by or for RTÉ

The Apocalypse of Bill Lizard
The Comedy Improv Radio Show
Beyond the Back of Beyond
Scrap Saturday

New Zealand 
ZM - Hamish and Andy
RNZ Comedy

United Kingdom 
The 99p Challenge
Absolute Power
Babblewick Hall
Beyond Our Ken
The Cabaret of Dr Caligari
The Clitheroe Kid
Clare in the Community
Dead Ringers
Elastic Planet
The Glums
The Goon Show
Hancock's Half Hour
Hello, Cheeky!
The Hitchhiker's Guide to the Galaxy
I'm Sorry I Haven't A Clue
I'm Sorry, I'll Read That Again
It Sticks Out Half a Mile
It's That Man Again
Just a Minute
Knowing Me, Knowing You
Ladies of Letters
Lenin of the Rovers
Little Britain
Living with the Enemy
The Mark Steel Revolution
The Mark Steel Solution
The Masterson Inheritance
The Men from the Ministry
The Mighty Boosh
My Word!
The Navy Lark
Nebulous
The News Huddlines
The News Quiz
The Now Show
Old Harry's Game
On the Hour
On the Town with the League of Gentlemen
Radio Active
Revolting People
Round the Horne
Smelling of Roses
The Sunday Format
Truly, Madly, Bletchley

Produced by or for the BBC

15 Minute Musical
15 Minutes of Misery
15 Storeys High
4 at the Store
The 99p Challenge
Absolute Power
Alison and Maud
And Now in Colour
The Arthur Smith Lectures
Beat The Kids
Boothby Graffoe, In No Particular Order and Big Booth Too
The Brothers
The Burkiss Way
Cabin Pressure
Charm Offensive
The Christopher Marlowe Mysteries
Clare in the Community
Clive Anderson's Comedy Revolutions
Creme de la Crime
Concrete Cow
Comedians' Comedians
Comedy Album Heroes
Comedy Showcase
The Consultants
Dead Ringers
Deep Trouble (radio comedy series)
Delve Special
Dial M For Pizza
Educating Archie
Ed Reardon's Week
ElvenQuest
Fags, Mags and Bags
Fist of Fun
Flight of the Conchords
Flywheel, Shyster, and Flywheel
Four Joneses and a Jenkins
The Game's Up
Genius
Giles Wemmbley Hogg Goes Off
Geoffrey Boycott's Proper World History of Cricket
Getting Nowhere Fast
Goodness Gracious Me
The Goon Show
Hancock's Half Hour
The Harpoon
Hazelbeach
The Hitch Hiker's Guide to the Galaxy
The Hole in the Wall Gang
The House of Milton Jones
The Hudson and Pepperdine Show
Hut 33
I'm Sorry I Haven't a Clue
I'm Sorry, I'll Read That Again
In One Ear
It's Been a Bad Week
It's That Man Again
Jackie Mason
Jammin'
Jeremy Hardy Speaks to the Nation
Just a Minute
"John Finnemore's Souvenir Programme"
King Street Junior
Knowing Me, Knowing You
The League of Gentlemen
Lionel Nimrod's Inexplicable World
Lines From My Grandfather's Forehead
Linda Smith's A Brief History of Timewasting
Little Britain
Loose Ends
Mackay the New
Man of Soup
The Mark Steel Lectures
The Mark Steel Revolution
The Mark Steel Solution
The Mel and Sue Thing
Men from the Ministry
Mitch Benn's Crimes Against Music
That Mitchell and Webb Sound
Much Binding in the Marsh
The Museum of Everything
The National Theatre of Brent
The Navy Lark
Nebulous
Newsjack
The News Huddlines
The News Quiz
Nightcap
The Now Show
Old Harry's Game
The Omar Khayyam Show
On the Hour'The Party LinePaperback HellPeople Like UsPolice 5...to 12 The Problem with Adam BloomQuote... UnquoteRadio ActiveRecorded for Training PurposesThe Remains of Foley and McCollRobin and Wendy's Wet WeekendsRoom 101Ross Noble Goes GlobalRound the HorneRoute One, USASaturday Night FryThe SitCromSon of ClicheSteptoe and SonThe Sunday FormatTake It From HereThink the UnthinkableThe Unbelievable TruthThe Very World of Milton JonesWe've Been Here BeforeWhose Line Is It Anyway?World of PubYes Minister (adapted from television)You'll Have Had Your Tea (a spin-off from I'm Sorry I Haven't a Clue)

Produced by or for Resonance FMEntrance of the Gladiators USA The Abbott and Costello ShowThe Adventures of Ozzie and HarrietThe Adventures of TopperAmos & AndyThe Alan Young ShowThe Aldrich FamilyArchie AndrewsAudience of TwoAvalon TimeThe Baby Snooks ShowThe Best Show with Tom ScharplingThe Bob Burns ShowThe Bob Hope Show/The Pepsodent ShowBob & RayBeulahThe BickersonsThe Billie Burke ShowBlock and SullyBlondieBlue Ribbon TownThat Brewster BoyBurns and AllenCandid MicrophoneThe Charlie McCarthy ShowThe Chase and Sanborn HourChickenmanThe Credibility GapThe Cuckoo HourThe Dr Demento Radio ShowDuffy's TavernThe Durante-Moore ShowEasy AcesThe Eddie Cantor ShowFibber McGee and MollyThe Firesign TheatreFlywheel, Shyster, and FlywheelThe Fire Chief/Ed Wynn ShowThe Fred Allen ShowForever Ernest Gasoline AlleyThe GoldbergsThe Great GildersleeveGranby's Green AcresThe GrumpsThe Halls of IvyHere's MorganIt Pays to Be IgnorantThe Jack Benny ShowThe Jack Pearl Show/Baron MunchausenJean ShepherdThe Joe Penner ShowJoe and MabelThe Judy Canova ShowThe Jumbo Fire Chief ProgramThe Life of RileyLife with LuigiLum and AbnerMajor HoopleMeet Me at Parky'sThe Mel Blanc ShowThe Milton Berle Show/Three Ring Time/Let Yourself GoThe Morey Amsterdam ShowMy Favorite HusbandMy Friend IrmaThe National Lampoon Radio HourNutmeg Junction Our Miss BrooksPeople Are FunnyThe Phil Harris-Alice Faye ShowThe Raleigh Cigarette Program/The Red Skelton ShowSam 'n' HenrySeven Second DelaySmackoutThe SpeLcastThe Stan Freberg ShowStoopnagle and BuddStop Me If You've Heard This OneTalkback with Jerry GalvinTexaco Star TheaterTommy Riggs and Betty LouVic and SadeYou Bet Your LifeProduced by or for US public radioA Prairie Home Companion (Minnesota Public Radio)Car TalkComedy College (Minnesota Public Radio)Le Show (KCRW)NonProductive (WRSU-FM)Wait Wait... Don't Tell Me! (Chicago Public Radio)The Comedy-O-Rama Hour (Joe Bevilacqua)

Comedy Talk RadioThe Adam Carolla ShowArmstrong & GettyThe Bob & Tom ShowDon and Mike ShowThe Howard Stern ShowImus in the MorningMancow's Morning MadhouseThe Me and Him ShowThe Mark & Brian ShowOpie and AnthonyRon and FezGolden Age Variety Shows That Featured ComediansThe Big ShowThe Danny Kaye ShowThe Dodge Victory HourEd Sullivan EntertainsThe Fleischmann's Yeast Hour/ The Rudy Vallee ShowThe George Jessel ShowThe Gulf HeadlinersThe Jack Carson Show The Kate Smith ShowKraft Music HallThe Martin and Lewis ShowMonitorThe Ziegfeld Follies of the AirOtherLovelineHour of Slack''

See also
Lists of comedy films
List of comedy television series
List of theatrical comedies

References

Radio comedy